Adam Donald Bailey (born 13 January 1988) is an English professional footballer who currently plays as a midfielder for Hong Kong Premier League club HKFC.

Coaching career
As well as playing football, Bailey is the director of football at Vikings FC, a football club in Hong Kong.

Career statistics

Club

Notes

References

External links
 Yau Yee Football League profile

Living people
1988 births
English footballers
Association football midfielders
Hong Kong First Division League players
Hong Kong Premier League players
Hong Kong FC players
Double Flower FA players
English expatriate footballers
English expatriate sportspeople in Hong Kong
Expatriate footballers in Hong Kong